Almost all of the Caribbean islands are in the Caribbean Sea, with only a few in inland lakes. The largest island is Cuba. Other sizable islands include Hispaniola, Jamaica, Puerto Rico, North Andros, and Trinidad. Some of the smaller islands are referred to as a rock or reef.

Islands are listed in alphabetical order by country of ownership and/or those with full independence and autonomy. Islands with coordinates can be seen on the map linked to the right.

Antigua and Barbuda

There are 54 islands in Antigua and Barbuda. There are three main islands, the two populated islands (Antigua and Barbuda) and Redonda. There are 51 off-shore islands. The islands of the country of Antigua and Barbuda include:

Antigua, 
 Northeast Marine Management Area
 Prickly Pear Island
 Great Bird Island
 Galley Island Major
 Galley Island Minor
 Jenny Island
 Exchange Island
 Rabbit Island
 Lobster Island
 Long Island
 Maiden Island
 Rat Island
 Little Bird Island
 Hell's Gate Island
 Monocle Point Island
 Red Head Island
 Guiana Island
 Crump Island
 Nanny Island (Henry Island)
 Laviscounts Island
 Bird Island
 Round Island
 Hawes Island
 Little Island
 Green Island
 Pelican Island
 York Island
 Codrington Island
 Blake Island
 Cinnamon Island
 Five Islands
 Hawksbill Rock
 Johnson Island
 Maiden Island
 Moor Rock
 Mouse Island
 Neck of Land
 Sandy Island
 Smith Island
 The Sisters
 Vernon's Island
 Wicked Will Island
Barbuda, 
 Goat Island
 Kid Island
 Man of War Island
 Rabbit Island
Redonda (uninhabited),

The Bahamas 

The Commonwealth of the Bahamas is located in the Lucayan Archipelago, the portion of the Caribbean region in the North Atlantic Ocean rather than in or bordering the Caribbean Sea. There are 700 islands and 2,400 cays in The Bahamas. There are 30 inhabited islands. Andros Island is the largest island in the Bahamas. Large island groups include Berry Islands and Exuma. The following islands are some of the more notable islands (cays) (see the main article for a comprehensive listing of all islands):

Abaco Island, 
Abner Cay, 
Acklins, 
Adderley Cay (part of Exuma), 
Alder Cay, 
Ambergris Cay (Berrey Islands), 
Andros Island, 
Anna Cay, 
Arawak Cay (Fish Fry), 
Archers Cay, 
Athol Island, 
Atwood Cay (Samana Cay), 
Barataria Island (part of Exuma), 
Serranilla Bank (Beacon Cay), 
Bell Island, 
Berry Islands District, 
Big Major Cay (Pig Beach)
Bimini Islands, 
Bird Cay (part of Berry Islands), 
Bitter Guana Cay (part of Exuma), 
Bock Cat Cay (part of Exuma), 
Bonds Cay (part of Berry islands), 
Booby Cay, 
Bowe Cay (part of Exuma), 
Cabbage Cay (part of Berry Islands), 
Castaway Cay (private island and an exclusive port for Disney Cruise Line), 
Cat Island, 
Cat Cays (part of Bimini), 
Cay Sal Bank, 
Children's Bay Cay (part of Exuma, also called Williams Cay), 
Chub Cay, 
Cistern Cay (part of Berry Islands), 
Coakley Cay, 
Cockroach Cay, 
Comfort Cay (part of Berry Islands), 
Compass Cay, 
Conception Island, 
Cormorant Cay (part of Berry Islands), 
Crooked Island, 
Culmer's Cay (part of Exuma), 
Cupids Cay (Governor's Island), 
Current Island, 
Devils Cay (part of Berry Islands), 
Diamond Rock (part of Berry Islands), 
Discovery Island
Dolly Cay, 
Dove Cay, 
Egg Island, 
Elbow Cay, 
Elbow Cays (Cay Sal Bank), 
Eleuthera Island
Elizabeth Island, 
Exuma Island
Fortune Island (Long Cay), 
Frazer Hog Cay, 
Galliot Cay, 
Goat Cay
Gorda Cay (Castaway Cay), 
Grand Bahama, 
Great Exuma Island, 
Great Guana Cay, 
Great Harbour Cay, 
Great Inagua Island, 
Great Isaac Cay (Rock), 
Great Stirrup Cay
Green Turtle Cay
Halls Pond Cay
Harbour Island
Highbourne Cay
Hoffman Cay
Inagua Island
Iron Cay
Jewfish Cay
Joulter Cays
Lee Stocking Island
Little Abaco Island
Little Cistern Cay
Little Darby Island
Little Farmer's Cay
Little Harbour Cay
Little Inagua, 
Little Petit Cay
Little San Salvador Island (Half Moon Cay)
Little Stirrup Cay
Little Wax Cay
Little Whale Cay
Long Cay
Long Island, 
Lyford Cay
Madam Dau's Cay
Major's Island
Man Island
Man-O-War Cay
Mangrove Cay
Mayaguana
Middle Cay
Moore's Island
Moriah Harbour Cay
Musha Cay
New Providence, 
Norman's Cay
North Andros
North Bimini
North Cat Cay
North Elbow Cay
O'Brien Cay
Ocean Cay
Over Yonder Cay
Paradise Island
Perpall's Cay
Prime Cay
Ragged Island
Rose Island
Royal Island
Rum Cay
Russell Island
Salt Cay
Samana Cay
Sampson Cay
San Salvador Island, 
Sandy Cay
Schooner Cays
Scotland Cay
Seal Cay
South Bimini
South Cat Cay
South Stirrup Cay
Staniel Cay
Stocking Island
Stranger Cay
Sugar Loaf Cay
Sweeting Cay
Vigilant Cay
Waderick Wells Cay
Walker's Cay
Watling Island
Wax Cay
Windermere Island
Wood Cay

Barbados

There are currently two islands and two banks in Barbados. An additional historical island that no longer exists as an island is also included in this list.
Barbados, 
Culpepper Island (uninhabited), 
Pelican Island (Historical, uninhabited), 
Trader Bank, 
The Shadows (Bank),

Belize

There are about 180 islands in Belize. Some of the larger islands of Belize in the Caribbean Sea include:
Turneffe Atoll (Turneffe Islands),  
Ambergris Group, 
Douglas Cay, 
Drowned Cays, 
Hick's Cayes, 
Lighthouse Reef,

Colombia

Several Departments of Colombia include islands in the Caribbean area.

Bolívar Department

Islands of the Bolívar Department of Colombia include:

Rosario Islands (Islas del Rosario), 
Isla Grande, 
Isla Marina, 
Isla de Roberto, 
Isla Rosario, 
Isla del Tesoro, 
Isla del Pirata, 
Isla Pelicano, 
Isla Rosa, 
Isla Gigi, 
Fuerte Island, 
Tierra Bomba Island (Isla Tierra Bomba), 
Isla Barú, 
Isla de la Manga, 
Isla Diablo, 
Isla de Manzanillo, 
Isla Maparadita, 
Isla Cocosolo, 
Isla Brujas, 
Isla Abanico,

Córdoba Department
Islands in the Córdoba Department include:
 Islas Tortuguilla,

Magdalena Department
Islands in the Magdalena Department include:
Isla de Salamanca, 
Isla El Morro, 
Isla de La Aguja, ]
Isla Bóqueron Grande,

San Andrés, Providencia and Santa Catalina

Islands in the Archipelago of San Andrés, Providencia and Santa Catalina include:

Sucre Department

Islands in the Sucre Department include the following islands in the Archipelago of San Bernardo:

Bóqueron Island 
Cabruna Island (Isla Cabruna), 
Ceycén Island (Isla Ceycen), 
Mangle Island, 
Maravilla Island (Isla Maravilla), 
Múcura Island (Isla Múcura ), 
Palma Island (Isla Palma), 
Panda Island, 
Salamanquilla Island, 
San Barnardo Island, 
Santa Cruz del Islote, 
Tintipán Island,

Costa Rica

There are about 79 islands in Costa Rica. The largest islands in the Caribbean Sea are listed below:
Isla Calero, 
Isla Brava, 
Isla Uvita,

Cuba

Cuba consists of over 4,000 islands and cays surrounding the country's main island, many of which make up archipelagos. Off the south coast are two main archipelagos, Jardines de la Reina and the Canarreos Archipelago. The Sabana-Camagüey Archipelago runs along the northern coast and contains roughly 2,517 cays and islands. The Colorados Archipelago is located off the north-western coast. The following islands are some of the major islands in the island country Cuba:

Dominica

The island nation of Dominica with a total area of  includes two small, off-shore islands and one disputed island:
Dominica, 
Petit L'Ilet, 
Gros L'Ilet, 
Bird Island (Ile de Aves) - in dispute with Venezuela,

Dominican Republic

There are about 73 islands in the Dominican Republic, including the following islands:

Eastern part of the island of Hispaniola)
Catalina Island, 
Isla Beata, 
Isla Alto Velo, 
Cayo Levantado (Bacardi Island), 
Isla Saona,

France

The following sections show the islands of French Departments in the Caribbean.

Guadeloupe

Guadeloupe consists of six inhabited islands—Basse-Terre, Grande-Terre, Marie-Galante, La Désirade, and the two inhabited islands in the Îles des Saintes—as well as many uninhabited islands and outcroppings.

Martinique

There are about 46 islands in Martinique, including the following:

Îlet aux Rats (Bats Island), 
Caye Pinsonelle, 
Diamond Rock, 
Petit Îlet Duprey, 
Gros Îlet (Îlet Mandoline), 
Îlet Chancel, 
Île Petite Grenade, 
Îlet à Eaux Rats (Rocks), 
Îlet à Ramiers, 
Îlet à Toiroux (Îlet Poirier), 
Îlet Aux Rats, 
Îlet Baude, 
Îlet Boisseau (Îlet des Chardons),  
Îlet Cabrits, 
Îlet Chancel (Ilet Ramville), 
Ilet Chevalier (Ilet Lezard), 
Ilet De La Rose (Îlet Madame), 
Îlet Du Galion, 
Îlet Duquesnay, 
Îlet du Trésor, 
Ilet Fregate, 
Îlet Hardy, 
Îlet La Perle, 
Îlet Lapin, 
Îlet Lavigne (Gros Îlet), 
Îlet Long, 
Îlet Métrente, 
Îlet Oscar (Bonchard), 
Îlet Pelé, 
Îlet Petit Piton (Rocher de la Grotte), 
Ilet Petit Vincent, 
Îlet Petite Martinique, 
Îlet Ragot (Îlet de la Grotte, Ilet Duchamp), 
Îlet Saint Aubin, 
Îlet Sainte-Marie, 
Îlet Tartane, 
Îlet Thierry, 
Ilets Aux Chiens, 
Les Trois Ilets, 
Martinique, 
Petit Îlet, 
Petit Ilet Duprey, 
Sugarloaf Rock, 
Table du Diable, 
Trou Terre Island,

Saint Barthélemy

There are 18 islands in Saint Barthélemy, including the following:

 Île de Boulanger, 
 La Chaloupe, 
 Île Chevreau, 
 Île Coco, 
 Île Fourche (Île Fourchue), 
 Île Frégate, 
 Îles des Grenadins (Rock), 
 Les Gros Îlets, 
 Île du Pain de sucre, 
 Île Pelé, 
 La Petite Islette, 
 Île de la Pointe, 
 Roche le Boeuf, 
 Roche Plate, 
 Saint Barthélemy (also Saint Barts), 
 Île Toc Vers, 
 Îlet au Vent, 
 La Tortue,

Collectivity of Saint Martin

There are seven islands and two rocks in the French Collectivity of Saint Martin, including:
 Northern part of the island of Saint Martin, 
 Caye Chateau, 
 Caye Verte, 
 Creole Rock (Crowl Rock),  or 
 Grand Îlet, 
 Petite Clef, 
 Pinel Island, 
 Rocher de l'Anse Marcel (rock), 
 Île Tintamarre,

Grenada

There are over 600 islands and islets in Grenada and the Grenadines. The notable islands in Grenada include: 

Calivigny Island, 
Caille Island, 
Carriacou, 
Diamond Island, 
Fota Island, 
Frigate Island, 
Glover Island (Ramier Island), 
Green Island, 
Grenada, 
Hog Island, 
Hope Island (Bacolet Island), 
Jack Adam Island, 
Large Island, 
Levera Island (Sugar Loaf Island), 
Mabouya Island, 
Marquis Island (Soubisse Island), 
Mushroom Island, 
Pearls Rock, 
Petite Dominique, 
Petite Martinique, 
Carriacou and Petite Martinique, 
Ronde Island, 
Saline Island, 
Sandy Island, 
White Island,

Haiti

There are about 59 islands in Haiti, including the following:

Caye Sable, 
Gonâve Island, 
Grosse Caye, 
Hispaniola (Eastern part), 
Ilet a Brouee, 
Île-à-Vache (Cow Island), 
Isle Cacique, 
Les Cayemites
Grand Cayemite, 
Petite Cayemite, 
Navassa Island (claimed by both Haiti and the United States), 
Tortuga Island (Turtle Island),

Honduras

There are at least 99 islands in Honduras, including the following Caribbean islands:

Cayos Cochinos (Islas de la Bahía, also called Hog Islands), 
Cayo Gorda, 
Islas de la Bahía, 
 Cayo Sur, 
 Guanaja, 
 Roatán (Isla Roatan), 
 Utila, 
 Swan Islands
Isla Grande, 
Little Swan Island (Isla Pequeña), 
 Misteriosa Bank
 Rosario Bank

Jamaica

There are about 49 islands in the island nation of Jamaica, including the following islands:

Bajo Nuevo Bank (uninhabited), 
Great Goat Island, 
Jamaica, 
Lime Cay, 
Little Goat Island, 
Morant Cays, 
Navy Island, 
Pedro Cays, 
Port Royal Cays (uninhabited), 
Sandals Royal Caribbean Resort & Offshore Island,

Kingdom of the Netherlands
The Antillean islands in the island countries (Aruba, Bonaire, Curaçao, Saba, and Sint Maarten, as well as the solitary island Sint Eustatius) of the Kingdom of the Netherlands are listed below. Collectively, these islands were formerly considered the Netherlands Antilles, and still are often referenced as the Dutch Caribbean.

Aruba

There are at least five islands in Aruba:

 Aruba, 
 Indiaanskop, 
 Key Cay
 Long Cay
 Renaissance Island,

Curaçao

There are at least seven islands in Curaçao, including:

Curaçao, 
Kadoesjie, 
Klein Curaçao, 
Eiland Penso, 
Isla Makuaku, 
Kadoesji, Curaçao, 
Sapaté Eiland,

Sint Maarten

There are ten total islands of Sint Maarten, including:

Saint Martin (southern part), 
Cow and Calf Island, 
Guana Key of Pelikan (Guana Cay), 
Hen and Chicken, 
Little Key, 
Mal Aborder, 
Mollibeday Rots (Molly Beday Rock), 
Mona Island, 
Pelikan Rock, Sint Maarten (Pelican Island), 
Pond Island, 
Snoopy Island, 

The Caribbean islands (Bonaire, Saba and Sint Eustatius special municipalities) in the country of the Netherlands of the Kingdom are listed below.

Caribbean Netherlands

 Bonaire (special municipality of the Netherlands):
Bonaire Island, Bonaire, 
Eiland Ranch, Bonaire, 
Klein Bonaire, Bonaire, 
Meeuwtje, 
Willemberg, 
Camia, 
Isla Makuka
Sint Eustatius, Sint Eustatius Special Municipality, 
Saba (special municipality of the Netherlands)
Saba Island, Saba, 
Green Island, Saba, 
Little Island, Saba, 
Pilot Rots (Rocks),

Mexico 

There are several islands of Mexico on the Caribbean Sea, including:

Isla Cancún, 
Isla Cozumel, 
Isla Contoy,  
Isla Holbox,  
Isla Mujeres,

Nicaragua

There are over 150 islands in Nicaragua, including the following islands in the Caribbean Sea:

Corn Island, 
Little Corn Island, 
Miskito Cays (reef), 
Pearl Cays, 
Calala Island (private island), 
Pigeon Cay (Cayo de la Paloma),

Panama 

There are several hundreds of islands in Panama, including the following islands in the Caribbean:

Isla Bastimentos, 
Cayos Zapatilla, 
Isla Carenero, 
Isla Cayo Agua, 
Isla Colón, 
Isla Cristóbal, 
Isla Popa, 
Isla Solarte, 
Isla Escudo de Veraguas, 
Galeta Island, 
Isla Cabra, 
Isla Grande, 
Corazón de Jesús, 
Narganá, 
Soledad Miria,

Saint Kitts and Nevis

There are about 20 islands in Saint Kitts and Nevis, including:

Booby Island, 
Crokus Cay
Dalzel Island
Dodan Island
Dulcina Island
East Cay
Eden Island
Fahie Island
Friars Bay
Gardner Island
Garvey Island
Golden Cay
Jessop Island
Maddens
Meves Island
Nevis, 
Otters Island
Saint Kitts (Saint Christopher), 
Sugar Loaf
Vambelle Island

Saint Lucia

There are 15 islands in Saint Lucia, including:

Barrel o' Beef
Burgot Rocks
Dennery Island, 
Des Bateaux Island, 
Fous Island, 
Frigate Island, 
L'Islet a Ramier
Liverpool Rocks
Maria Islands, 
Pigeon Island, 
Praslin Island, 
Rat Island, 
Rouche Island, 
Saint Lucia, 
Scorpion Island,

Saint Vincent and the Grenadines

There are about 49 islands in Saint Vincent and the Grenadines, including:

All Awash Island, 
Baliceaux Island, 
Bequia, 
Bettowia (Battowia), 
Black Rock
Brooks Rocks
Bullet Cay, 
Cactus Cay
Canouan Baleine
Canouan Island, 
Catholic Island, 
Chateaubelair Islet, 
Church Cay, 
Cow And Calves Islands
Dike Island, 
Double Rock
Dove Cay, 
Dove Island, 
Ellen Rock
Fort Duvernette Island (Duvernette Islet), 
Frigate Island, 
L'Islot, 
Litte Savan, 
Mayreau, 
Middle Cay (St. Elairs Cay), 
Milligan Cay, 
Mopion Islet
Mustique, 
Palm Island (Prune Island), 
Pelican Cay
Petit Canouan, 
Petit Cay, 
Petit Mustique, 
Petit Nevis, 
Petit Saint Vincent, 
Petit Tabac
Pigeon Island, 
Pillories
Big Pillory, 
Middle Pillory, 
Little Pillory, 
Punaise
Isle à Quatre, 
Rabbit Island, 
Red Island, 
Saint Elairs Cay, 
Saint Vincent, 
Sand Cay
Savan, 
Savan Rock (Little Savan), 
Semplars Cay
Tobago Cays, 
Petit Rameau, 
Petit Bateau, 
Petit Tobac, 
Jamesby, 
Baradal, 
Syrup Cay
Union Island, 
West Cay
Wilks Island
Young Island,

Trinidad and Tobago

There are 44 islands in Trinidad and Tobago, including:

 Caledonia Island, 
 Chacachacare, 
 Craig Island (Craig and Caledonia are joined by a narrow causeway), 
 Cronstadt Island (Kronstadt), 
 Carrera Island, 
 Faralon (Flat Rock), off San Fernando Harbour, 
 Gaspar Grande (Gasparee), 
 Gasparillo (Little Gasparee or Centipede Island), 
 Huevos
 Lenagan Island, 
 Little Tobago (Bird of Paradise Island), 
 Monos, 
 Nelson Island, 
 Pelican Island, 
 St. Giles Island, 
 Saut d'Eau, 
 Goat Island, 
 Sisters' Rocks, 
 Soldado Rock, 
 Tobago, 
 Trinidad,

United Kingdom
The following is a list of islands of current island nations of the British Overseas Territories that are in the Caribbean.

Anguilla

There are about 19 islands in Anguilla, including:

 Anguillita, 
 Dog Island, 
 East Cay, 
 Little Island, 
 Little Scrub Island, 
 Mid Cay, 
 North Cay
 Prickly Pear Cays, 
 Rabbit Island
 Sandy Island, 
 Scilly Cay, 
 Scrub Island, 
 Seal Island, 
 Sombrero (Hat Island), 
 South Weneger Island
 West Cay,

British Virgin Islands

There are about 51 islands in the British Virgin Islands (16 inhabited), including: 

Anegada, 
Beef Island, 
Bellamy Cay, 
Broken Jerusalem (Rocks), 
Buck Island, 
Carvel Rock, 
Cockroach Island, 
Cooper Island, 
Dead Chest, 
East Seal Dog Island, 
Eustatia Island, 
Fallen Jerusalem Island, 
Frenchman's Cay, 
George Dog Island, 
Ginger Island, 
Great Camanoe, 
Great Dog Island, 
Great Thatch, 
Great Tobago Island, 
Green Cay, 
Guana Island, 
Jost Van Dyke, 
Little Camanoe, 
Little Jost Van Dyke, 
Little Seal Dog Island
Little Thatch, 
Marina Cay, 
Mosquito Island, 
Mosquito Rock, 
Nanny Cay (land-tied),
Necker Island, 
Norman Island, 
Pelican Island, 
Peter Island, 
Prickly Pear Island, 
Red Rock, 
Round Rock, 
Saba Rock, 
Salt Island, 
Sandy Cay, 
Sandy Spit, 
Scrub Island, 
Tortola (largest island), 
The Indians (rock), 
Virgin Gorda, 
West Seal Dog Island, 
West Dog Island, 
Whale Rocks,

Cayman Islands

The following are the islands of the Cayman Islands:

Montserrat

There are only a few islands in Montserrat, including:

Montserrat (Largest island), 
Little Redonda and Virgin, 
Statue Rock,

Turks and Caicos Islands 

The British Overseas Territory of the Turks and Caicos Islands is located in the Lucayan Archipelago, the portion of the Caribbean region in the North Atlantic Ocean rather than in or bordering the Caribbean Sea. There are about 75 islands and land-tied islands in Turks and Caicos Islands, including the following notable islands:

Big Ambergris Cay, 
Bird Island (Pear Cay), 
East Caicos, 
Grand Turk, 
Little Ambergris Cay, 
Mangrove Cay, 
Middle Caicos, 
North Caicos, 
Parrot Cay, 
Pear Cay, 
Providenciales Island, 
Salt Cay, 
South Caicos, 
West Caicos,

United States
The following are disputed islands of the United States in the Caribbean:

Navassa Island
Serranilla Bank
Bajo Nuevo Bank

The following sections show islands of island territories of the United States in the Caribbean.

Puerto Rico

There are about 142 island in Puerto Rico, including:

Alcarraza, 
Bajo Evelyn (Evelyn Shoal), 
Cabeza de Perro, 
Cayo Ahogado, 
Cayo Alfeñique, 
Cayo Algodones, 
Cayo Arenas, 
Cayo Ballena, 
Cayo Batata, 
Cayo Bayo, 
Cayo Berberia, 
Cayo Botella, 
Cayo Cabritas, 
Cayo Caracoles, 
Cayo Caribe, 
Cayo Chiva, 
Cayo Collado, 
Cayo Corral, 
Cayo Diablo, Fajardo, 
Cayo Diable, Vieques, 
Cayo Don Luis, 
Cayo Enrique, 
Cayo Fanduca, 
Cayo Icacos, 
Cayo Jalova, 
Cayo Jalovita, 
Cayo Largo (Largo Shoals), 
Cayo Lobito, 
Cayo Lobo, 
Cayo Lobos, 
Cayo Maria Langa, 
Cayo Mata - Guayanilla municipality, 
Cayo Mata - Salinas municipality, 
Cayo Mata Seca, 
Cayo Matojo, 
Cayo Morrillo, 
Cayo Norte, 
Cayo Palomas, 
Cayo Parguera, 
Cayo Piñerito, 
Cayo Pirata, 
Cayo Puerca, 
Cayo Ratón, 
Cayo Ratones - Fajardo municipality, 
Cayo Real, 
Cayo Rio, 
Cayo Santiago, 
Cayo Sombrerito, 
Cayo Terremoto, 
Cayo Tiburón, 
Cayo Tuna, 
Cayo Verde, 
Cayo Vieques, 
Cayo Yerba, 
Cayo Luis Peña, 
Cayo de Tierra, 
Cayo del Agua, 
Cayo del Agua, 
Cayos Cabezazos, 
Cayos Caribes, 
Cayos de Barca, 
Cayos de Caña Gorda, 
Cayos de Caracoles, 
Cayos de Pájaros, 
Cayos de Ratones, 
Cayos Geniqui, 
El Ancón, 
El Mono, 
Isla Caja de Muertos, 
Gata Islets, 
Isla Culebrita, 
Isla de Cardona, 
Isla de Culebra, 
Isla del Erio
Isla Cabras, 
Isla Chiva, 
Isla Cueva, 
Isla de Cerro Gordo, 
Isla de Cabras, 
Isla de las Palomas, 
Isla de Ramos, 
Isla Desecheo,  - Mayagüez municipality
Isla Guachinanga, 
Isla Guayacán, 
Isla La Cancora, 
Isla Magueyes, 
Isla Matei, 
Isla de Mona, 
Isla Mata la Gata, 
Isla Monito, 
Isla Morrillito, 
Isla Palominitos, 
Isla Piedra
Isla Puerca
Isla San Juan
Isla Yallis
Isletas de Garzas
Islote de Juan Perez
Isla de Mona - Mayagüez municipality
Isla de Ratones, Ponce
Isla de Ratones (Cabo Rojo municipality)
Isla de Vieques
Isla Monito - Mayagüez municipality
Islote Numero dos
Isla Palominitos, 
Isla Palominos, 
Isla Piñeros, 
La Blanquilla
La Cordillera
Las Cabritas
Las Cucarachas
Las Hermanas
Las Lavanderas del Este
Las Lavanderas del Oeste
Los Farallones
Los Gemelos
Los Negritos
Mata Redonda
Pela
Pelaita
Penon Brusi
Penon de Afuera
Penon de San Jorge
Piedra Stevens
Piedra del Norte
Piragua de Adentro
Piragua de Afuera, 
Puerto Rico (Boriken Island), 
Punta Larga, 
Punta Mosquitos, 
Roca Alcatraz, 
Roca Cocinera, 
Roca Cucaracha, 
Roca Culumna, 
Roca Ola, 
Roca Resuello, |
Roca Speck, 
Roca Velásquez, 
Tres Hermanas, 
Tres Hermanos,

United States Virgin Islands

There are about 84 islands in the United States Virgin Islands, including:

Barrel of Beef, 
Blinders Rocks, 
Booby Rock, 
Bovoni Cay, 
Buck Island - Saint Croix, 
Buck Island - Saint Thomas, 
Calf Rock, 
Capella Islands, 
Carval Rock or Carvel Rock,  
Cas Cay, 
Cinnamon Cay, 
Cockroach Island, 
Coculus Rock, 
Cololoba Cay, 
Congo Cay, 
Cow Rock, 
Cricket Rock, 
Current Rock, 
Dog Island, 
Dog Rocks, 
Domkirk Rock, 
Dry Rock, 
Durloe Cays, 
Dut Cheap Cay
Fish Cay, 
Flanagan Island, 
Flat Cays, 
Gorret Rock, 
Grass Cay, 
Great Saint James Island, 
Green CaySaint Croix, 
Green Cay - Saint Thomas, 
Hans Lollik Island, 
Hans Lollik Rock, 
Hassel Island, 
Henley Cay, 
Inner Brass Island, 
Kalkun Cay, 
Leduck Island, 
Limestone Rock, 
Little Hans Lollik Island, 
Harvey Island (Saint Croix), 
Little Saint James Island, 
Lizard Rocks, 
Lovango Cay, 
Mingo Cay, 
Outer Brass Island, 
Packet Rock, 
Patricia Cay, 
Pelican Cay, 
Perkins Cay, 
Porpoise Rocks, 
Protestant Cay, 
Ramgoat Cay, 
Rata Cay, 
Rotto Cay, 
Rupert Rock, 
Ruth Island, 
Saba Island, 
Saint Croix, 
Saint John, 
Saint Thomas, 
Salt Cay, 
Saltwater Money Rock, 
Sandy Point Rock, 
Savana Island, 
Shark Island, 
Skipper Jacob Rock, 
Steven Cay, 
The Stragglers, 
Sula Cay, 
Thatch Cay, 
Triangle Islands, 
Trunk Cay, 
Turtleback Rock, 
Turtledove Cay, 
Two Brothers, 
Water Island, 
Waterlemon Cay, 
Welk Rocks, 
West Cay, 
Whistling Cay, 

Saint Thomas, Saint Croix, Saint John, and Water Island are the main four United States Virgin Islands. The capital, Charlotte Amalie, is on Saint Thomas.

Islands of the State of Florida

While not technically part of the Caribbean, the islands of the Florida in the United States are considered by some to be part of the greater Caribbean Region. Regions of Florida include: South Florida, Southwest Florida, and the Florida Keys.
Geiger Key, 

Key West, 
Key Largo, 
Stock Island,

Venezuela

The following islands of Venezuela are in the Caribbean Sea:

Archipiélago Las Aves
Isla La Blanquilla, 
Archipiélago Los Monjes, 
Archipiélago Los Roques, 
Isla de Aves, 
Isla de Coche, 
Isla de Cubagua, 
Isla de Patos, 
Isla de Toas, 
Isla de Zapara. 
Isla La Orchila, 
Isla La Sola, 
Isla La Tortuga, 
Isla Margarita, 
Isla San Carlos, 
Islas los Frailes, 
Islas Caracas, 
Islas los Hermanos, 
Islas los Testigos,

See also

List of Caribbean islands by area
List of Caribbean island countries by population
List of metropolitan areas in the West Indies
List of Caribbean islands by political affiliation
List of islands by population density
List of West Indian First-level Subdivisions
Low island (island of coral origin), Coral island

References

 
Islands
West Indies
Caribbean